Jaden Patrick McNeil (born May 17, 1999) is an American white nationalist and far-right live-streamer. In 2021, the Anti-Defamation League described McNeil as an "America First" Groyper. He is most notable for being the former Turning Point USA chapter president of Kansas State University. He is the founder and former president of America First Students. McNeil was formerly treasurer of the America First Foundation, a nonprofit organization which organizes AFPAC (an annual conference associated with the Groyper movement) and other political events.

He was described by the Southern Poverty Law Center (SPLC) as a "sidekick personality" of Nick Fuentes. In May 2022, he broke ties with Fuentes and the Groyper movement. During a podcast, McNeil stated that after "years as a loyal footsoldier to Fuentes," he was left with "no money, no friends, and no prospects".

Career 

In January 2020, Groyper and former leader of Kansas State University's Turning Point USA chapter Jaden McNeil formed the Kansas State University organization America First Students. The group, which shares a name with Nick Fuentes' America First podcast, is part of the Groypers.

On June 25, 2020, one month after George Floyd was murdered by a police officer, McNeil posted to Twitter a tweet which purported to "congratulate" Floyd on being one-month drug free. After KSU condemned the tweet, staff and students of KSU called for McNeil to be expelled. KSU's football team also boycotted the school due to the inaction from higher ups on reprimanding McNeil. McNeil remained unapologetic and was not expelled. McNeil is no longer a student at KSU.

On April 30, 2022 McNeil resigned from his position as treasurer of the America First Foundation, and has since feuded with Fuentes and the groypers. In an interview on a podcast called Kino Casino on May 6, McNeil claimed that his role as treasurer was in name only, with Fuentes in control of the organization's finances. The group's finances had been severely affected by Fuentes' and McNeil's involvement with the rallies leading up to the 2021 United States Capitol attack, and at the time of McNeil's resignation, Fuentes was, and still currently is, under federal investigation. In the same interview, McNeil and another former employee of the America First Foundation, Simon Dickerman, made numerous other claims about Fuentes, accusing Fuentes of having "brainwashed" his followers, faking his Catholicism, and secretly being homosexual.

References

1999 births
Living people
Kansas State University alumni
American Internet celebrities
Alt-right activists
American white nationalists
Live streamers